Stolbov is a Russian male surname, its feminine counterpart is Stolbova. It may refer to:
Alexander Stolbov (born 1929), Russian painter
Ksenia Stolbova (born 1992), Russian figure skater
Pavel Stolbov (1929–2011), Russian gymnast 

Russian-language surnames